Doreen Vennekamp (born 5 April 1995) is a German sport shooter.

She participated at the 2018 ISSF World Shooting Championships, winning a medal.

Records

References

External links

Living people
1995 births
German female sport shooters
ISSF pistol shooters
People from Gelnhausen
Sportspeople from Darmstadt (region)
Shooters at the 2019 European Games
European Games medalists in shooting
European Games gold medalists for Germany
Shooters at the 2020 Summer Olympics
21st-century German women